Orthotics is a medical specialty that focuses on the design and application of orthoses, or braces. An  is "an externally applied device used to influence the structural and functional characteristics of the neuromuscular and skeletal systems."

Orthotists are professionals who specialize in the provision of orthoses.

Classification

Orthotic devices are classified into four areas of the body according to the international classification system (ICS): orthotics of the lower extremities, orthotics of the upper extremities, orthotics for the trunk, and orthotics for the head.

Orthoses are also classified by function: paralysis orthoses, relief orthoses, and soft braces.

Under the International Standard terminology, orthoses are classified by an acronym describing the anatomical joints that they contain. For example, a knee-ankle-foot orthosis (English abbreviation: KAFO for Knee-ankle-foot Orthoses) spans the knee joint, the ankle, and the foot. A spinal orthosis (English abbreviation: TLSO for Thoraco-Lumbo-Sacral Orthoses) affects the thoracic spine, the lumbar spine and the sacrum. Use of the International Standard is promoted to reduce the widespread variation in the description of orthoses, which is often a barrier to the interpretation of research studies.

The transition from an orthosis to a prosthesis can be fluid. An example of this is compensating for a leg length discrepancy, which is equivalent to replacing a missing part of a limb. Another example is the replacement of the forefoot after a forefoot amputation. This treatment is often made from a combination of a prosthesis to replace the forefoot and an orthosis to replace the lost muscular function (orthoprosthesis).

Orthotist

An orthotist is a primary medical clinician responsible for the prescription, manufacture, and management of orthoses. The manufacture of modern orthoses requires that the orthotist acquire or have both manual skills in processing traditional and innovative materials and artistic skills in modeling body shapes. Orthotics also combines knowledge of anatomy and physiology, pathophysiology, biomechanics and engineering. Currently, CAD/CAM, CNC machines and 3D printing are involved in orthotic manufacture.

In the United States, orthotists work by prescription from a licensed healthcare provider. Physical therapists are not legally authorized to prescribe orthoses in the U.S. In the U.K., orthotists will often accept open referrals for orthotic assessment without a specific prescription from doctors or other healthcare professionals.

Prescription and manufacturing 

Orthoses are offered as:
 Custom-fabricated products – they are in the foreground of an optimal supply and are individually manufactured. If the physical examination of a patient is carried out precisely, the clinical picture often shows a combination of several functional deviations. Each functional deviation can be slight or severe. The combination of the functional deviation and its characteristics leads to a detailed indication. A major advantage of custom-made products is that the various necessary orthotic functions when doing the configuration of the orthotics can be optimally matched to the determined functional deviations. Another advantage of custom-made products is that each orthosis is made to fit the individual body shape of the patient. Custom-fabricated products were traditionally made by following a trace of the extremity with measurements to assist in creating a well-fitted device. Subsequently, the advent of plastics and later even more modern materials such as carbon fiber composites and aramid fibers as materials of choice for construction necessitated the idea of creating a plaster of Paris mold of the body part in question. This method is still extensively used throughout the industry. By introducing composite materials made of carbon fiber materials and aramid fibers embedded in an epoxy resin matrix, the weight of modern orthoses is extremely reduced. With this technique, modern orthoses can achieve perfect stiffness in the areas where this is necessary (e.g., the connection between the ankle and knee joint) and flexibility in the areas where flexibility is required (e.g., in the area of the forefoot on the foot part of an orthosis).
 Semi-finished products – they are used for fast supply in the case of diseases that occur frequently. They are manufactured industrially and in some cases can be adapted to the anatomical body conditions. Semi-finished products are also referred to as prefabricated products and custom fitted products, but in these cases it is not custom-fabricated.
 Finished products – these include short-term orthoses or bandages for a limited duration of therapy and are manufactured industrially. Finished products are also referred to as off-the-shelf products.

Both custom-fabricated products and semi-finished products are used in long-term care and are manufactured or adapted by the orthotist or by trained orthopedic technicians according to the prescription. In many countries the physician or clinician defines the functional deviations in his prescription, e.g. paralysis (paresis) of the calf muscles (M. Triceps Surae) and derives the indication from this, e.g. orthotic to restore safety when standing and walking after a stroke. The orthotist creates another detailed physical examination and compares it with the prescription from the physician. The orthotist describes the configuration of the orthosis, which shows which orthotic functions are required to compensate for the functional deviation of the neuromuscular or skeletal system and which functional elements must be integrated into the orthosis for this. Ideally, the necessary orthotic functions and the functional elements to be integrated are discussed in an interdisciplinary team between physician, physical therapist, orthotist and patient.

Lower limb orthoses 

All orthoses that affect the foot, the ankle joint, the lower leg, the knee joint, the thigh or the hip joint belong to the category of orthoses for the lower extremities.

Paralysis orthoses 
Paralysis orthoses are used both for paralyses with complete functional failure of muscles or muscle groups, as well as for incomplete paralysis (paresis). They are intended to correct or influence functional limitations or to replace functions that have been lost as a result of the paralysis. Functional leg length differences caused by paralysis can be compensated for using the orthosis.

For the quality and function of a paralysis orthosis, it is of great importance that the orthotic shells are in total-contact fitting with the patient's leg to create an optimal fit, which is why a custom-made orthotic is often preferred. 

Reducing the weight of an orthosis makes a significant contribution to lowering the energy costs of walking for those affected, which is why the use of highly resilient and at the same time light materials such as carbon fiber, titanium and aluminum is indispensable for the manufacture of a custom-made orthosis.

The production of a custom-made orthosis also offers the advantage that orthotic joints can be integrated into the orthosis. By using orthotic joints, the dynamics of the orthotic can be matched exactly with the pivot points of the axes of movement of the anatomical joints of the lower extremity. Since the dynamics of the orthosis are realized via the orthotic joints, it is possible to manufacture the orthotic shells as stable and torsion-resistant. As a result, the dynamics of the orthosis take place exactly where the movements are dictated by the anatomy in the skeletal system. This is necessary for the quality and function of the orthosis. The orthosis thus offers the necessary stability to regain the security that has been lost due to paralysis when standing and walking.

In addition, an orthosis can be individually configured through the use of orthosis joints. In this way, the function of the orthotic device can be optimally adjusted to any existing functional deviations that have resulted from the muscle weakness via the combination of the orthotic joints and the adjustability of the functional elements. The goal of high-quality orthotic fitting is to adapt the functional elements so precisely to the functional deviation that the orthosis provides the necessary support. At the same time, the orthotic device should restrict the dynamics of the lower extremities as little as possible through the adjustable dynamics of the orthotic joints in order to promote the remaining functionality of the muscles.

Determination of strength levels for physical examination 
In the case of paralysis due to diseases or injuries to the spinal/peripheral nervous system, the strength levels of the six major muscle groups of the affected leg are first determined as part of the physical examination, in order to determine the necessary functions of an orthosis.
 The dorsiflexors move the foot through concentric muscle work around the axis of the ankle in the direction of dorsiflexion and control the plantar flexion through eccentric muscle work.
 The plantar flexors contribute significantly to being able to stand upright by actuating the forefoot lever and thereby increasing the standing area when standing. This group of muscles moves the foot in the direction of plantar flexion.
 The knee extensors extend the knee in the direction of the knee extension.
 The knee flexors bend the knee in the direction of the knee flexion.
 The hip flexors bend the hip joint in the direction of the hip flexion.
 The hip extensors stretch the hip joint in the direction of the hip extension and at the same time extend the knee in the direction of the knee extension.

A muscle function test according to Vladimir Janda is carried out to determine the strength levels. The degree of paralysis is given for each muscle group on a scale from 0 to 5, with the value 0 indicating complete paralysis (0%) and the value 5 indicating normal strength (100%). The values between 0 and 5 indicate a percentage reduction in muscle function. All strength levels below 5 are referred as muscle weakness.

The combination of strength levels of the muscle groups determines the type of orthosis (AFO or KAFO).

In addition, the strength levels of the muscle groups result in the necessary functional elements of the orthosis, which compensate for the restrictions caused by the reduced level of strength of the respective muscular functions.

Physical examination for paralysis due to diseases or injuries to the spinal cord and/or the peripheral nervous system 
Paralysis may be caused by diseases or injuries to the spinal or peripheral nervous system after spinal cord injury and also occur in spina bifida, poliomyelitis and Charcot-Marie-Tooth disease. In this group of paralyzes, the inclusion of the strength levels of the large muscle groups is of elementary importance in order to determine the necessary orthotic functions when configuring the orthosis.

Physical examination for paralysis due to diseases or injuries to the central nervous system 
Paralysis caused by diseases or injuries to the central nervous system (e.g. cerebral palsy, traumatic brain injury, stroke, and multiple sclerosis).

When determining the necessary functions of an orthosis, it makes sense to consider the group of paralyzes caused by diseases or injuries to the central nervous system separately from the group of paralyzes due to diseases or injuries to the spinal or peripheral nervous system. Incorrect motor impulses from the central nervous system often result in clearly visible deviations in the gait pattern. The necessary functions of an orthosis in this group of paralyzes can therefore only be determined to a limited extent by determining the muscle weakness in strength levels of the six major muscle groups. Even with results with high degrees of strength, disturbances of the gait pattern can be recognizable in these paralyzes due to the incorrect control of the central nervous system.

Cerebral palsy (CP) and traumatic brain injury 

In patients with paralysis due to cerebral palsy (CP) and traumatic brain injury, but who are able to walk, the gait pattern is analyzed as part of the physical examination to determine the necessary functions of an orthosis. One way of assessing is the classification according to the "Amsterdam Gait Classification". According to this classification method, five gait types are described. To assess the gait pattern, the patient is viewed visually or via a video recording from the side of the leg to be assessed. At the point in time at which the leg to be viewed is in mid-stance and the leg not to be viewed in mid-swing, the knee angle and also the contact of the foot with the ground are assessed.

In gait type 1, the knee angle is normal and foot contact is complete. In gait type 2, the knee angle is hyperextended and the foot contact is complete. In gait type 3, the knee angle is hyperextended and foot contact is incomplete (only on the forefoot). In gait type 4, the knee angle is flexed and foot contact is incomplete (only on the forefoot). At gait 5, the knee angle is flexed and foot contact is complete.

Gait type 5 is also known as crouch gait.

Patients with paralysis due to cerebral palsy or traumatic brain injury are usually treated with an ankle-foot orthosis (AFO). The functional elements to be used in the orthosis are the same as the functional elements of an AFO to compensate for paralysis of large muscle groups. However, it is important to understand that the muscle groups are not paralyzed, but are controlled by the brain with the wrong impulses. The compensatory gait is an unconscious reaction to the lack of security when standing or walking. The gait pattern usually worsens with increasing age. If the right functional elements are integrated into the orthosis, which both maintain physiological mobility and provide security when standing and walking, the necessary motor impulses can be created to create new cerebral connections. The goal of an orthotic fitting is the best possible approximation of the physiological gait pattern.

Stroke 

In the case of paralysis after a stroke, rapid care with an orthosis is necessary. Often areas of the brain are affected that contain "programs" for controlling the musculoskeletal system. With the help of an orthosis, physiological standing and walking can be learned again, and late health consequences caused by a wrong gait pattern can be prevented. In order to consider the correct functional elements when configuring the orthosis, it is important to understand that the muscle groups are not paralyzed, but are controlled by the brain with wrong impulses, which is why a muscle function test according to Vladimir Janda can lead to incorrect results when assessing the ability to stand and walk.

An important basic requirement for regaining the ability to walk is that the patient trains early on to be able to stand on both legs safely and well balanced. An orthosis with functional elements to support balance and safety when standing and walking can already be integrated into the therapy concept to support the first standing exercises. This makes the work of mobilizing the patient at an early stage easier. If the right functional elements are integrated into the orthosis, which both maintain physiological mobility and provide security when standing and walking, the necessary motor impulses can be created to create new cerebral connections. Clinical studies confirm the importance of orthoses in stroke rehabilitation.

Patients with paralysis after a stroke are often treated with an ankle-foot orthosis (AFO).

After a stroke, it can happen that only the dorsiflexors are supplied with incorrect impulses from the central nervous system, which can lead to the risk of stumbling due to insufficient foot lifting when walking during swing phase. In these cases, an orthosis that only has functional elements to support the dorsiflexors can be helpful. Such an orthosis is also called drop foot orthosis. However, when configuring such a foot lifter orthosis, it makes sense to use adjustable functional elements for setting the resistance, which make it possible to adapt the passive lowering of the forefoot (plantar flexion) to the eccentric work of the dorsal flexors during loading response.

In many cases the muscle group of the plantar flexors is supplied with wrong impulses from the central nervous system, which leads to great uncertainty when standing and walking. The compensatory gait is an unconscious reaction to the lack of security when standing or walking. When configuring an orthosis, functional elements that can restore safety when standing and walking must be used in these cases. In such cases, a foot lifter orthosis is not suitable for restoring the lack of safety, since it only has functional elements that compensate for the functional deviations in the event of weakness of the dorsiflexors.

In patients with paralysis after stroke, but who are able to walk have the option of analyzing the gait pattern as part of the patient history in order to determine the optimal function of an orthosis. One way of assessing is the classification according to the "N.A.P. Gait Classification". N.A.P. is a physiotherapeutic treatment concept. According to this classification, four gait types are described. The gait pattern is assessed in the gait phase in which the leg to be viewed is in mid-stance phase and the leg not to be viewed is in mid-swing.

To assess the gait, in the first step, the patient is viewed visually or via a video recording from the side of the leg to be assessed. In gait type 1 the knee angle is hyperextended. In gait type 2 the knee angle is flexed.

The patient is then viewed from the front. If the forefoot is on the outer edge of the foot, which is accompanied by a varus position in the knee, the letter "a" is added to the gait. This foot position is called inversion. If the patient stands on the inner edge of the foot, which is associated with a valgus position in the knee, the letter "b" is added to the gait type. This foot position is called eversion.

The patients can be classified according to gait types 1a, 1b, 2a or 2b. The goal of orthotic fitting for patients who are able to walk is the best possible approximation of the physiological gait pattern.

Multiple sclerosis (MS) 

In the case of paralysis due to multiple sclerosis, the degree of strength of the six major muscle groups of the affected leg should be determined as part of the physical examination, just as in the case of diseases or injuries to the spinal/peripheral nervous system, in order to determine the necessary functions of an orthosis. However, patients with multiple sclerosis may experience muscular or cognitive fatigue beyond the physiological level. The fatigue can be more or less pronounced and, depending on the severity, lead to considerable restrictions in everyday life. Persistent stress (e.g. walking) causes a deterioration in muscle function and has a significant effect on the spatial and temporal parameters when walking, for example by significantly reducing the cadence and walking speed. Fatigue can be measured as muscle weakness. As part of the patient's medical history when determining the strength levels of the six major muscle groups, fatigue can be taken into account by using a standardized walking test. The six-minute walk test is suitable for this. The muscle function test according to Vladimir Janda is carried out in combination with the six-minute walk test in the following steps:

 first muscle function test (without muscular fatigue)
 six-minute walk test directly followed by
 second muscle function test (with muscular fatigue)

This sequence of muscle function test and -minute walk test is used to check whether a controlled muscular fatigue can be induced. If the test reveals that there is muscular fatigue, the strength levels should be included in the planning of an orthosis, taking into account the measured fatigue when determining the functional elements.

Functional deviations in the case of paralysis of large muscle groups 
Paralysis of the Dorsiflexors – weakness of the dorsiflexors results in a so-called drop foot. The patient's foot can only be insufficiently lifted when walking during the swing phase, since the necessary concentric work of the dorsiflexors can not be activated. There is a risk of stumbling. In addition, the patient cannot influence the shock absorption when walking (gait phase, loading response), as the eccentric work of the dorsiflexors is limited. After Initial heel contact the forefoot slaps too quickly on the floor via the heel rocker, which creates an audible noise or the foot does touch the floor with forefoot first, which disrupts gait development.

Paralysis of the Plantar flexors – If the plantar flexors are weak, the muscles of the forefoot lever are only inadequately activated or not activated at all. The patient has no balance when standing and has to support himself with aids such as crutches. There is a lost of energy during walking. The forefoot lever required for energy-saving walking in the gait phases from mid-stance to pre-swing cannot be activated by the plantar flexors. This leads to excessive dorsiflexion in the ankle joint in terminal stance. The center of gravity of the body lowers towards the end of the stance phase and the knee of the contralateral leg is flexed excessively. With each step, the center of gravity must be raised above the leg with the excessively flexed knee by straightening it. Since the plantar flexors have their origin above the knee joint, they also have a knee-extension effect in the stance phase.>

Paralysis of the Knee extensors – if the knee extensors are weak, there is an increased risk of falling. The physiological knee flexion is only inadequately or not controlled by the knee extensors when walking between loading response to the mid-stance. To control the knee, the patient develops compensatory mechanisms that lead to an incorrect gait pattern. That leads for example in the initial contact with the forefoot and not with the heel takes place in order to prevent the knee-flexing effect of the heel rocker. Another way to compensate for weak knee extensors is to exaggerate the activation of the plantar flexors, which leads into hyperextension of the knee.

Paralysis of the Knee flexors – if the knee flexors are weak, it is more difficult to flex the knee in pre-swing.

Paralysis of the Hip flexors – if the hip flexors are weak, it is more difficult to flex the knee in pre-swing.

Paralysis of the Hip extensors – the hip extensors support the control of the knee against unwanted flexion when walking between loading response and mid-stance.

Functional elements in paralysis of large muscle groups 
The functional elements of an orthosis ensure the flexion and extension movements of the ankle joint, the knee joint and the hip joint. They correct and control the movements and secure the joints against undesired incorrect movements, e.g. to avoid falls when standing or walking.

Functional elements in paralysis of the dorsiflexors – if the dorsiflexors are weak, an orthosis should lift the forefoot during the swing phase in order to reduce the risk of the patient stumbling. An orthosis that has only one functional element for lifting the forefoot in order to compensate for a weakness in the dorsiflexors is also known as a drop foot orthosis. If other muscle groups, such as the plantar flexors, are weak, additional functional elements must be taken into account. An AFO of the drop foot orthosis type is therefore not suitable for the care of patients with weakness in other muscle groups. In addition, initial contact with the heel should be achieved by lifting the foot through the orthosis. If the dorsiflexors are very weak, dynamic functional elements, in which the resistance of the plantar flexion can be adjusted, should also take over the control of the rapid drop of the forefoot. They should be able to be adapted to the functional deviation of the dorsiflexors in order to correct the shock absorption via the heel rocker lever of the orthosis in loading response, without blocking the plantar flexion. Static functional elements that block the plantar flexion of the ankle joint lead to excessive flexion in knee and hip and thereby to an increased energy consumption when walking, which is why such a technical solution is not recommended due to newer technical alternatives.

Functional elements in paralysis of the plantar flexors – in order to compensate for a weakness of the plantar flexors, the orthosis has to transfer great forces that the strong muscle group of the plantar flexors would otherwise take over. The forces in the orthosis are transmitted in a similar way to a ski boot during downhill skiing via the functional elements of the foot part, ankle joint and lower leg shell. Dynamic functional elements should preferably be used in the ankle joint in order to secure the dorsiflexion. Static functional elements would completely block the dorsiflexion. A completely blocked dorsiflexion would have to be compensated by compensatory movements in the upper body, which would result in an increasing of energy cost when walking. The resistance of the functional element to protect against unwanted dorsiflexion should be able to be adapted to the weakness of the plantar flexors. In the case of very weak plantar flexors, the resistance of the functional element to secure against undesired dorsiflexion must be very high in order to be able to compensate for the functional deviations of the plantar flexors. Adjustable functional elements of an orthosis allow an exact adjustment of the resistance to the weakness of the muscle and scientific studies have come to the recommendation that the resistance of the orthosis should be adjustable in patients with paralysis or weakness of the plantar flexors.

Functional elements in paralysis of knee extensors and hip extensors – in the case of weak knee extensors or hip extensors, the orthosis must take over the stability and stance phase control when walking. Depending on the weakness of these two muscle groups, different knee-securing functional elements are integrated into the orthosis. In order to compensate for functional deviations with slightly weakness of these muscle groups, free moving mechanical knee joints with a posterior shift of the mechanical pivot point behind the anatomical knee pivot point can be sufficient. In the case of significant weakness, the knee flexion effect when walking must be controlled by functional elements that mechanically secure the knee joint against unwanted knee flexion in the early stance phases between loading response and mid stance. Stance phase control knee joints can be used here. These lock the knee joint in the early stance phases and release the knee joint for knee flexion during the swing phase. With stance phase control knee joints, a natural gait pattern can be achieved despite mechanical securing against unwanted knee flexion. In these cases, locked knee joints are often used, which have a good safety function, but do not allow knee flexion when walking during swing phase. The knee joint remains mechanically locked during the swing phase. Patients with locked knee joints have to manage the swing phase with stiff leg. This only works if the patient develops compensatory mechanisms, e.g. by raising the body's center of gravity in the swing phase (Duchenne limping) or by swinging the orthotic leg to the side (circumduction). Stance phase control knee joints and locked joints can be mechanically "unlocked" so that the knee joint can be flexed to sit down.

Ankle–foot orthoses (AFO) in the field of paralysis orthoses 

AFO is the abbreviation for ankle-foot orthoses; English name for an orthosis that spans the ankle and foot. In the treatment of paralyzed patients, an AFO is mainly used when there is a weakness of the dorsiflexors or plantar flexors.

Through the use of modern materials such as carbon fibers and aramid fibers and the new knowledge about processing these materials in composite fiber materials, the weight of orthotics has been extremely reduced compared to previous techniques. Taking into account the weight reduction, it were these materials and technologies that created the possibility of making special areas of an orthosis so rigid that the forces of the weakened muscles can actually be taken over by the AFO, e.g. the connection from the ankle joint to the frontal contact surface on the shin. At the same time, the areas in which flexibility is required can be produced very flexibly, e.g. the flexible part of the forefoot.

The new technologies with the possibility of producing lightweight orthotics with high rigidity values at the same time brought new demands on orthotics:

 Despite the necessary rigidity, the orthoses should not block the mobility of the ankle.
 Despite the necessary rigidity, the orthoses should not block the functionality of the muscles, but rather promote it.
 Despite the necessary rigidity, contractures and spasticity should not be stimulated.

Since several years it has been possible to combine the required rigidity of the orthotic shells with simultaneous dynamics in the ankle.

A custom-made AFO can compensate for the functional deviations of the muscle groups mentioned. It should be configured according to the patient data through a function and load calculation so that it meets the functional requirements and the loads. When calculating or configuring, functional variants are optimally matched to individual requirements with regard to the functional elements in the area of the ankle joint, the stiffness of the foot shell and the shape of the lower leg shell. The size of the components used is selected by calculating their resilience to match the load data.

An ankle joint based on new technology is the connection between the foot shell and the lower leg shell and at the same time contains all the necessary adjustable functional elements of an AFO.

Different functional elements to compensate for a weakness of the dorsiflexors or a weakness of the plantar flexors can be integrated into the ankle joint of the orthosis depending on the combination of the degree of paralysis of the two muscle groups. In case of weakness of both muscle groups, both functional elements should be integrated in one orthotic joint. The necessary dynamics and the resistance to movements in the ankle are specifically adapted via adjustable functional elements in the ankle joint of the orthosis. In this way, the orthosis can compensate for muscle weaknesses in order to provide safety when standing and walking and at the same time allow as much mobility as possible. For example, adjustable spring units with pre-compression can enable an exact adaptation of the static basic resistance and the dynamic movement resistance to the measured degree of muscle weakness. Studies show the positive effects of these new technologies. It is of great advantage if the resistances for these two functional elements can be set separately.

An AFO with functional elements to compensate for a weakness of the plantar flexors can also be used for slight weakness of the knee-securing muscle groups, the knee extensors and the hip extensors.

An AFO that has only one functional element for lifting the forefoot in order to compensate for a weakness in the dorsiflexors is also known as a drop foot orthosis. If other muscle groups, such as the plantar flexors, are weak, additional functional elements must be taken into account. An AFO of the drop foot orthosis type is therefore not suitable for the care of patients with weakness in other muscle groups.

Before these new technologies were available, there was a standard that the International Committee of the Red Cross published in its 2006 Manufacturing Guidelines for Ankle-Foot Orthoses. At that time, the aim was already to offer people with disabilities worldwide standardized processes for the production of high-quality, modern, durable and economical devices.

Because the new technologies are still not widely used, AFOs are often still made from polypropylene-based plastic, mostly in the shape of an "L" with the upright part behind the calf and the lower part under the foot. The continuous "L" shape of these constructions, however, only offers the rigidity that can be produced with these materials. Such constructions made of polypropylene are still called "DAFO (dynamic ankle-foot orthosis)", "SAFO (solid ankle-foot orthosis)" or "Hinged AFO". Either they are not stable enough to transfer the high forces required to balance the weak plantar flexors when standing and walking (DAFO) or they block the mobility of the ankle joint (SAFO). A "Hinged AFO" at that time, only allow for the compensation of that kind of muscular weakness that could be achieved with the orthotic joints available at that time. In this technology, for example, it is still common to block plantar flexion, as the orthotic joints available at the time cannot simultaneously transmit the large forces that are required to compensate for muscle deviations and at the same time offer the necessary dynamics. While there was this multitude of AFOs in clinical practice, which differed in their design, studies have already established that there was a clear lack of details regarding the design and the materials used for manufacture. Eddison and Chockalingam have called for a new standardization of the terminology. With a focus on the care of children with cerebral palsy (CP), there was already a recommendation from clinical practice in the context of the manufacture of orthotics made of polypropylene and their multitude of possible designs that the potential for improving the gait pattern through specifically adapted orthotics through further studies to investigate. The integration of orthotic joints with modern functional elements in the old production technology with polypropylene, on the other hand, is unusual because the orthotic shells made of polypropylene could not transfer the high forces under the boundary condition of an acceptable weight or would be too soft.

New studies now show the better possibilities for improving the gait pattern through the new technologies.

Unfortunately, today's terminologies were determined on the basis of the technologies available until then and therefore now require a particularly high level of explanation.

The International Committee of the Red Cross published its manufacturing guidelines for ankle–foot orthoses in 2006. Its intent is to provide standardized procedures for the manufacture of high-quality modern, durable and economical devices to people with disabilities throughout the world. Because of the studies already mentioned above which recognize the new technologies available, the main types mentioned are in need of revision today.

Knee-ankle-foot orthosis (KAFO) in the field of paralysis orthoses 

KAFO is the abbreviation for ankle-foot orthoses; English name for an orthosis that spans the knee, the ankle and the foot. In the treatment of paralyzed patients, a KAFO is used when there is a weakness of the knee extensors or hip extensors. The orthotic ankle joint forms the connection between the foot shell and the lower leg shell and the orthotic knee joint forms the connection between the lower leg shell and the thigh shell.

A KAFO can be roughly divided into three variants, which essentially differ in the function of the mechanical knee joint used, "knee joint locked", "knee joint unlocked" or "knee joint locked and unlocked".

KAFO with locked knee joint - The mechanical knee joint of a KAFO with locked knee joint is locked when standing and also locked when walking in both the stance phase and the swing phase in order to achieve the necessary stability when standing and walking. To sit, the user can unlock the knee joint. When walking with a KAFO with a locked knee joint, it is difficult for the user to swing the leg forward in swing phase. In order not to stumble, the leg must be swung forward laterally to the direction of movement in the form of a circular arc (circumduction) or the hip of the affected leg must be raised unnaturally in order to achieve swing of the stiff leg. Each of these incorrect gait patterns can lead to secondary diseases in the bone and muscle system. In any case, such compensatory movement patterns lead to increased energy consumption when walking. The film Forrest Gump impressively shows how the main character Forrest Gump is additionally hindered in his urge to move by such orthoses. For centuries, a KAFO was built with mechanical knee joints that stiffened the knee of the paralyzed leg. Even today, such orthotic fittings are still common. Typical designations for a KAFO with a locked knee joint include "KAFO with Swiss lock" or "KAFO with drop lock lock".

KAFO with unlocked knee joint - The mechanical knee joint of a KAFO with an unlocked knee joint can move freely when standing and can also move freely when walking, both in the stance phase and in the swing phase, in order to ensure that the leg swings through without stumbling, with the necessary knee flexion of approx 60° to allow. The user does not need to unlock the knee joint to sit. A KAFO with a non-locked knee joint can only compensate to a small extent for paralysis-related uncertainties when standing and walking. In order to increase the safety function, an orthotic knee joint with a rearward displacement of the pivot point can be installed in the KAFO. However, a KAFO with a non-locked knee joint, even with a backward displacement of the pivot point, should only be used in the case of minor paralysis of the knee and hip extensors. With more severe paralysis with low levels of strength in these muscle groups, there is a significant risk of falling. A typical designation for a KAFO with a non-locked knee joint is, among other things, "KAFO with knee joint for movement control".

KAFO with locked and unlocked knee joint - The mechanical knee joint of a KAFO with locked and unlocked knee joint is locked when walking in the stance phase. In the stance phase, the necessary stability and security is achieved for the user. The knee joint is automatically unlocked in the swing phase. By unlocking it in the swing phase, the leg can be swung through without stumbling. In order to be able to walk energy-efficiently and without stumbling without compensating mechanisms, the mechanical knee joint used should allow a knee flexion of approx. 60° in the swing phase.The first promising developments of automatic knee joints or stance phase locking knee joints emerged in the 1990s. In the beginning there were automatic mechanical constructions that took over the locking and unlocking. Automatic electromechanical and automatic electrohydraulic systems are now available that make standing and walking safer and more comfortable. Various terms are used for a KAFO with a locked and unlocked knee joint. Typical designations are "KAFO with automatic knee joint" or "KAFO with stance phase control knee joint". In scientific articles, the English term Stance Control Orthoses SCO is often used. This term differ from the ICS classification, which is why one of the first two terms is preferable.

Different functional elements to compensate for a weakness of the dorsiflexors or a weakness of the plantar flexors can be integrated into the ankle joint of the orthosis depending on the combination of the degree of paralysis of the two muscle groups. It is of great advantage if the resistances for these two functional elements can be set separately.

The functional elements to compensate for paralysis of the knee-securing muscle groups, the knee extensors and the hip extensors, are integrated into the knee joint of the orthosis via knee-securing functional elements.

A KAFO can compensate for the limitations of the named muscle groups through the variety of combinations of different variants in the stiffness of the foot shell, the different variants of the functional elements of a dynamic ankle joint, the variants in the shape of the lower leg shell and the functional elements of a knee joint.

Hip-knee-ankle-foot orthosis (HKAFO) in the field of paralysis orthoses 
HKAFO is the abbreviation for ankle-foot orthoses; English name for an orthosis that spans the hip, the knee, the ankle and the foot. In the treatment of paralyzed patients, a HKAFO is used when there is a weakness of the pelvic stabilizing trunk muscles.

Relief orthoses 
Relief Orthoses are used both in degeneration and after injuries to joints. These includes torn ligaments and wear and tear of joints. Relief orthoses are also used after operations such as a complete replacement of a joint or operations on the joint structure or other operations on bony, muscular structures or operations on the joint ligaments.

Relief orthosis may also be used to:
 Control, guide, limit and/or immobilize an extremity, joint or body segment for a particular reason
 Restrict movement in a given direction
 Assist movement generally
 Reduce weight-bearing forces for a particular purpose
 Aid rehabilitation from fractures after the removal of a cast
 Otherwise correct the shape and/or function of the body, to provide easier movement capability or reduce pain

Ulcer healing orthoses (UHO) 
A custom-made ankle/foot orthosis for the treatment of patients having plantar ulcers is disclosed, which comprises a rigid L-shaped support member and a rigid anterior support shell articulated on a hinge to the L-shaped support member. The plantar portion of the L-shaped member further comprises at least one ulcer-protecting hollow spatially located for fitted placement in inferior adjacency to a user's plantar ulcer, thus allowing the user to transfer the user's weight away from the plantar ulcer and facilitating plantar ulcer treatment. The anterior support shell is designed for lateral hinged attachment to the L-shaped member to take advantage of medial tibial flare structure for enhancing the weight-bearing properties of the disclosed orthosis. A flexible, polyethylene hinge member attaches by hinge to the anterior support shell to the L-shaped member and securing straps securely attach the anterior support shell in fixed, weight-bearing relation about the proximal, anterior portion of the user's lower leg.

Foot orthoses (FO)

Foot orthoses (commonly called orthotics) are devices inserted into shoes to provide support for the foot by redistributing ground reaction forces acting on the foot joints while standing, walking or running. They may be either pre-moulded (also called pre-fabricated) or custom made according to a cast or impression of the foot. A great body of information exists within the orthotic literature describing their medical use for people with foot problems as well as the impact orthotics can have on foot, knee, hip, and spine deformities. They are used by everyone from athletes to the elderly to accommodate biomechanics deformities and a variety of soft tissue conditions. Foot orthoses are effective at reducing pain for people with painful high-arched feet, and may be effective for people with rheumatoid arthritis, plantar fasciitis, First metatarsophalangeal (MTP) joint pain or hallux valgus (bunions). For children with juvenile idiopathic arthritis (JIA) custom-made and pre-fabricated foot orthoses may also reduce foot pain. Foot orthoses may also be used in conjunction with properly fitted orthopedic footwear in the prevention of foot ulcers in the at-risk diabetic foot. A real-time weight bearing orthotic can be created using a neutral position casting device and the Vertical Foot Alignment System VFAS.

Ankle–foot orthoses (AFO) in the field of relief orthoses 
An AFO is also used to immobilize the ankle and lower leg in the presence of arthritis or fracture.Ankle–foot orthoses are the most commonly used orthoses, making up about 26% of all orthoses provided in the United States. According to a review of Medicare payment data from 2001 to 2006, the base cost of an AFO was about $500 to $700. A recent study looked at the prescription practices amongst the clinical practitioners in the United Kingdom to explore the material used, the thickness of the material, positive cast rectification, AFO reinforcement, footplate design, padding, strapping system, and the height of an AFO. This study found that there is a consensus in practice.

Knee orthoses (KO) in the field of relief orthoses 
A knee orthosis (KO) or knee brace is a brace that extends above and below the knee joint and is generally worn to support or align the knee. In the case of diseases causing neurological or muscular impairment of muscles surrounding the knee, a KO can prevent flexion or extension instability of the knee. In the case of conditions affecting the ligaments or cartilage of the knee, a KO can provide stabilization to the knee by replacing the function of these injured or damaged parts. For instance, knee braces can be used to relieve pressure from the part of the knee joint affected by diseases such as arthritis or osteoarthritis by realigning the knee joint into valgus or varus. In this way a KO may help reduce osteoarthritis pain, however, there is no clear evidence to advise people with osteoarthritis of the knee about the most effective orthosis to use or the best approach to rehabilitation. A knee brace is not meant to treat an injury or disease on its own, but is used as a component of treatment along with drugs, physical therapy and possibly surgery. When used properly, a knee brace may help an individual to stay active by enhancing the position and movement of the knee or reducing pain.

Prophylactic, functional and rehabilitation braces
Prophylactic braces are used primarily by athletes participating in contact sports. Evidence about prophylactic knee braces, the ones football linemen wear that are often rigid with a knee hinge, indicates they are ineffective in reducing anterior cruciate ligament tears, but may be helpful in resisting medial and lateral collateral ligament tears.

Functional braces are designed for use by people who have already experienced a knee injury and need support to recover from it. They are also indicated to help people who have pain associated with arthritis. They are intended to reduce the rotation of the knee and support stability. They reduce the chance of hyperextension, and increase the agility and strength of the knee. The majority of these are made of elastic. They are the least expensive of all braces and are easily found in a variety of sizes.

Rehabilitation braces are used to limit the movement of the knee in both medial and lateral directions- these braces often have an adjustable range of motion stop potential for limiting flexion and extension following ACL reconstruction. They are primarily used after injury or surgery to immobilize the leg. They are larger in size than other braces, due to their function.

Soft braces 
A soft brace is sometimes also called soft support or a bandage. Bandages, which belong to the field of orthoses, are so-called support bandages, which are supposed to protect the joints from excessive loads. Soft braces are also classified according to regions of the body. In sport, bandages are used to protect bones and joints. One of the purposes of these braces is injury protection. They mostly consist of textiles, some of which have supportive elements. The supporting functions are low compared to paralysis and relief orthoses. Bandages should also achieve proprioceptive. Equally, orthoses are sometimes used prophylactically or to optimize performance in sport. At present, the scientific literature does not provide sufficient high quality research to allow strong conclusions on their effectiveness and cost-effectiveness.

Upper limb orthoses 
Upper-limb (or upper extremity) orthoses are mechanical or electromechanical devices applied externally to the arm or segments thereof in order to restore or improve function or structural characteristics of the arm segments encumbered by the device. In general, musculoskeletal problems that may be alleviated by the use of upper limb orthoses include those resulting from trauma or disease (arthritis for example). They may also be beneficial in aiding individuals who have a neurological impairment such as stroke, spinal cord injury, or peripheral neuropathy. Disease is the standard respiratory rate.

Types of upper-limb orthoses
Upper-limb orthoses
Clavicular and shoulder orthoses
Arm orthoses
Functional arm orthoses
Elbow orthoses
Forearm-wrist orthoses
Forearm-wrist-thumb orthoses
Forearm-wrist-hand orthoses
Hand orthoses
Upper-extremity orthoses (with special functions)

Spinal orthoses

Scoliosis, a condition describing an abnormal curvature of the spine, may in certain cases be treated with spinal orthoses, such as the Milwaukee brace, the Boston brace, Charleston bending brace, and Providence brace. As this condition develops most commonly in adolescent females who are undergoing their pubertal growth spurt, compliance with wearing is these orthoses is hampered by the concern these individuals have about changes in appearance and restriction caused by wearing these orthoses.
Spinal orthoses may also be used in the treatment of spinal fractures.

A Jewett brace, for instance, may be used to facilitate healing of an anterior wedge fracture involving the T10 to L3 vertebrae. A body jacket may be used to stabilize more involved fractures of the spine. There are several types of orthoses for managing cervical spine pathology. The halo brace is a cervical thoracic orthosis used to immobilize the cervical spine, usually following fracture. The halo brace allows the least cervical motion of all cervical orthoses currently in use; it was first developed by Vernon L. Nickel at Rancho Los Amigos National Rehabilitation Center in 1955.

Orthoses for the head 
Helmets are an example of orthoses for the head.

See also 

Orthotist
Cognitive orthotics
Comparison of orthotics
Dental braces
Orthotic horseshoes
Neuromechanics of orthoses
Cervical collar
Orthopedic cast
Back brace
Pet orthotics

References

External links 
International Society of Prosthetists and Orthotists
American Academy of Orthotists and Prosthetists
British Association of Prosthetists and Orthotists
The Orthotics & Prosthetics Virtual Library
PFA Footcare Association (Canadian Chapter)

Muscular system
Orthopedic braces
Orthopedics
Podiatry
Rehabilitation team
Skeletal system